John of Reading (died 1346) was an English Franciscan theologian and scholastic philosopher. He was an early opponent of William of Ockham, and a follower of Duns Scotus. He wrote a commentary on the Sentences around 1320, at the University of Oxford. He argued for the unity of science.

In 1322 he moved to a teaching position at Avignon, then the seat of the Avignon Papacy. Reading is buried at Avignon.

Notes

References

Bibliography
 Katherine H. Tachau, Optics, Epistemology and the Foundations of Semantics, 1250-1345 (1988) pp. 165–179

External links
Franaut page

1346 deaths
English Franciscans
English theologians
Franciscan theologians
Year of birth unknown
English philosophers
Scholastic philosophers
People from Reading, Berkshire
14th-century philosophers